Jangal Deh-e Pain (also Romanized as Jangal Deh-e Pā’īn; also known as Jangal Deh) is a village in Chehel Chay Rural District, in the Central District of Minudasht County, Golestan Province, Iran. At the 2006 census, its population was 186, in 54 families.

References 

Populated places in Minudasht County